Kambojika Putta Khemara Tarei (Khmer: កម្ពោជិកបុត្តាខេមរាតរី) is a dragon boat from Cambodia. The boat holds the Guinness record of being the longest dragon boat in the world. The boat was showcased during the 2018 Water Festival in Phnom Penh.

History
The boat was built to remember the history of production and use of dragon boats by the Khmer people and Khmer kings in older times, who used dragon boats as means of transport to defend the territory. Construction of the boat began in April 2018 and it took nearly seven months to finish the construction. The boat measures  in overall length,  in width and it can accommodate 179 oarsman. More than 13,000 people participated in the construction of the boat and it was completely hand-made.

The name Kambojika Putta Khemara Tarei translates to “Dragon Boat of Khmer Youth in Cambodian Territory".

The 179 oarsman in the boat symbolizes the day Cambodia was liberated from Khmer Rouge (7 January 1979); 1 being the month and 79 the year.

Images

References 

Dragon boat racing
Boat types
Guinness World Records